James Stewart Robert Kerr (born 13 November 1974) is a Scottish former professional footballer who played as a goalkeeper for Celtic, Swindon Town, Brighton and Wigan Athletic. Kerr was forced into early retirement at the age of 27 due to a back injury.

Kerr was appointed to Scottish First Division club Airdrie United as goalkeeper coach in August 2008, where he was part of the Scottish Challenge Cup winning side and also recruited and mentored goalkeeper Lee Hollis who went on to play for Motherwell and Heart of Midlothian.

Kerr left that position to join Scottish Premier League side Motherwell in September 2009, where he was credited with developing current  Norwich City and England goalkeeper John Ruddy, as well as West Ham and Republic of Ireland goalkeeper Darren Randolph.

Kerr left Motherwell in December 2011 to become goalkeeper coach for Major League Soccer side Toronto FC. During his time at Toronto, Kerr was responsible for recruiting and developing current Orlando City Number 1 Joe Bendik and Canada international goalkeeper Quillan Roberts. Kerr also coached and prepared legendary Brazilian goalkeeper Julio Cesar in Toronto for the 2014 FIFA World Cup in Brazil, which resulted in Cesar telling the world's press that Kerr was the best goalkeeper coach he has ever worked with. On 31 August 2014 Kerr left his position as Goalkeeper Coach of Toronto FC after Ryan Nelsen was fired as head coach. On 13 November 2014, Kerr was appointed as a Soccer Consultant to Toronto FC's parent company, Maple Leaf Sports and Entertainment.

On 24 December 2015, Kerr was named as first-team goalkeeper coach for MLS side Orlando City. He worked again with Joe Bendik, who then had an outstanding season. Bendik won the MLS "Save of the Week" a record 11 times, with Kerr receiving huge credit for repairing Bendik's confidence. On 8 December 2016 Kerr was promoted to the position of Director of Goalkeeping along with his position as First Team Goalkeeping Coach at Orlando City. One week later MLS side Vancouver Whitecaps asked for permission from Orlando City to speak to Kerr regarding the position of Head of Goalkeeping and First team Goalkeeper Coach after talks with Vancouver Kerr was appointed to the position on 5 January. Kerr enjoyed great success reaching the Western Conference  semi final and the Concacaf Champions League Semi Final in 2017.

Kerr left Vancouver in 2018 when Carl Robinson was controversially sacked. Kerr was then reunited with Adrian Heath in 2019 with MLS Club Minnesota United and was appointed Head Of Goalkeeping/ First team Goalkeeping Coach and the club subsequently achieved its First Play off appearance.

References

External links 

1974 births
Living people
People educated at Coltness High School
Footballers from Bellshill
Association football goalkeepers
Scottish footballers
Celtic F.C. players
Swindon Town F.C. players
Brighton & Hove Albion F.C. players
Wigan Athletic F.C. players
Motherwell F.C. non-playing staff
Scottish Football League players
Scottish Premier League players
English Football League players
Scottish expatriate sportspeople in Canada
Scotland under-21 international footballers
Toronto FC non-playing staff
Orlando City SC non-playing staff
Vancouver Whitecaps FC non-playing staff